Dennis Jaramel Villanueva (born April 28, 1992) is a Filipino professional footballer who plays as a defensive midfielder or a left back for Thai League 1 club Nakhon Ratchasima and the Philippines national team.

Born in Rome to Filipino parents, he spent his youth career with Lazio. He started his senior career with Ostia Mare in Serie D before playing in the Philippines for Global, Davao Aguilas, and Ceres–Negros.

Club
Villanueva was part of the Lazio youth. Villanueva also played for A.S. Ostia Mare Lido Calcio of Serie D. After his stint with the fourth division Italian Club. He was signed to play for Global of the United Football League in the Philippines. Villanueva played in all six of Global's matches at the 2015 AFC Cup. Villanueva is known for his fighting spirit and never-say-die attitude; in a match against Stallion F.C. on 22 February 2015 he scored a goal in stoppage time to seal a 2–1 win, earning the praise of coach Leigh Manson.

International
Villanueva was first called up to play for the Philippine national team at the 2014 AFF Suzuki Cup and was part of the squad's bench but was not subbed in. He was called up again for the national team's 2018 FIFA World Cup qualifier matches against Bahrain and Yemen scheduled on June 11 and 16 respectively. He was not subbed in at the Bahrain match but finally made his first international debut after being subbed in at the Yemen match replacing Stephan Palla at the 78th minute.

Personal life
Villanueva was born in Rome to Filipino parents and became involved in football at the age of five. His family roots can be traced to Laiya, San Juan, Batangas.

Career statistics

Club

Honours

Club
Global FC
United Football League: 2016
United Football League Cup: 2016

Notes

References

1992 births
Living people
Filipino footballers
Citizens of the Philippines through descent
Footballers from Rome
Italian people of Filipino descent
Philippines international footballers
A.S. Ostia Mare Lido Calcio players
Global Makati F.C. players
Davao Aguilas F.C. players
Ceres–Negros F.C. players
Dennis Villanueva
Dennis Villanueva
Dennis Villanueva
Association football midfielders